Kevin McDaid (born 7 March 1984) is a British singer. Born in Nigeria, he was brought up in England in Newcastle upon Tyne. He was best known as member of the British boy band V, which he joined in 2003 along with four other boys. The band had three fairly successful chart hits during 2004, before splitting up in February 2005, less than a year after their first single was released.

He now works as a personal trainer.

Personal life
In August 2005, he was announced in The Sun as the long-term boyfriend of Westlife member Mark Feehily. The couple appeared on the cover of the December 2007 issue of Attitude. They got engaged on 28 January 2010 but have since split up.

References

1984 births
Living people
English pop singers
Photographers from Northumberland
English LGBT singers
English LGBT photographers
Musicians from Newcastle upon Tyne
Musicians from Tyne and Wear
V (band) members
Nigerian LGBT singers
Nigerian emigrants to the United Kingdom
Nigerian people of British descent
21st-century English male singers
Nigerian gay musicians
Gay singers
Gay photographers
English gay musicians
English gay artists
20th-century Nigerian LGBT people
21st-century Nigerian LGBT people
20th-century English LGBT people
21st-century English LGBT people